The following is a list of songs recorded by South Korean girl group Itzy. To date, the girl group has released 50 songs, of which 45 are originally recorded in Korean,  4 are in Japanese, and 1 is in English.



Recorded songs

Notes

References 

Itzy